Rælingen Fotballklubb is a Norwegian association football club from Rælingen.

It was founded on 31 March 1930 as Rælingen SK. In 1938 it was merged with the local skiing club, but the merger was dissolved in 1948. Not long after, the club built a new football stadium. Both clubs were members of the Workers' Sports Confederation while it existed. In 1946 it incorporated the AIF club AIL Fremad.

The men's football team last played in the Third Division (fourth tier) in 2010. Previously it had stints from 2001 to 2005, and before that until 1999.

References

 Official site 

Football clubs in Norway
Sport in Akershus
Rælingen
Association football clubs established in 1930
Arbeidernes Idrettsforbund
1930 establishments in Norway